The Neotominae are a subfamily of the family Cricetidae. They consist of four tribes, 16 genera, and many species of New World rats and mice, predominantly found in North America. Among them are the well-known deer mice, white-footed mice, packrats, and grasshopper mice.

Neotomines are related to the other two subfamilies of mice in the New World, the Sigmodontinae and Tylomyinae. Many authorities place them all in a single subfamily, Sigmodontinae.

Taxonomy 
SUBFAMILY NEOTOMINAE
Tribe Baiomyini
Genus Baiomys - pygmy mice
Southern pygmy mouse, Baiomys musculus
Northern pygmy mouse, Baiomys taylori
Genus Scotinomys - brown mice
Alston's brown mouse, Scotinomys teguina
Chiriqui brown mouse, Scotinomys xerampelinus
Tribe Neotomini
Genus Neotoma - pack rats
Subgenus Neotoma
White-throated woodrat, Neotoma albigula
Tamaulipan woodrat, Neotoma angustapalata
†Anthony's woodrat, Neotoma anthonyi 
Bryant's woodrat, Neotoma bryanti
†Bunker's woodrat, Neotoma bunkeri 
Nicaraguan woodrat, Neotoma chrysomelas
Arizona woodrat, Neotoma devia
Eastern woodrat, Neotoma floridana 
Dusky-footed woodrat, Neotoma fuscipes
Goldman's woodrat, Neotoma goldmani
Desert woodrat, Neotoma lepida 
White-toothed woodrat, Neotoma leucodon
Big-eared woodrat, Neotoma macrotis
Allegheny woodrat, Neotoma magister
†San Martin Island woodrat, Neotoma martinensis 
Neotoma melanura
Mexican woodrat, Neotoma mexicana
Southern Plains woodrat, Neotoma micropus
Nelson's woodrat, Neotoma nelsoni
Bolaños woodrat, Neotoma palatina
Stephens' woodrat, Neotoma stephensi
Subgenus Teanopus
Sonoran woodrat, Neotoma phenax
Subgenus Teonoma
Bushy-tailed woodrat, Neotoma cinerea
Genus Xenomys
Magdalena rat, Xenomys nelsoni
Genus Hodomys
Allen's woodrat, Hodomys alleni
Genus Nelsonia - diminutive woodrats
Goldman's diminutive woodrat, Nelsonia goldmani
Diminutive woodrat, Nelsonia neotomodon
Tribe Ochrotomyini
Genus Ochrotomys
Golden mouse, Ochrotomys nuttalli
Tribe Reithrodontomyini
Genus Peromyscus - deer mice
californicus group
California mouse, Peromyscus californicus
eremicus group
Cactus mouse, Peromyscus eremicus
Angel Island mouse, Peromyscus guardia 
San Lorenzo mouse, Peromyscus interparietalis
Northern Baja deer mouse, Peromyscus fraterculus
Dickey's deer mouse, Peromyscus dickeyi
False canyon mouse, Peromyscus pseudocrinitus
Eva's desert mouse, Peromyscus eva
Burt's deer mouse, Peromyscus caniceps
Mesquite mouse, Peromyscus merriami
†Pemberton's deer mouse, Peromyscus pembertoni 
hooperi group
Hooper's mouse, Peromyscus hooperi
crinitus group
Canyon mouse, Peromyscus crinitus
maniculatus group
Eastern deermouse, Peromyscus maniculatus
Oldfield mouse, Peromyscus polionotus
Santa Cruz mouse, Peromyscus sejugis
Northwestern deer mouse, Peromyscus keeni
Black-eared mouse, Peromyscus melanotis
Slevin's mouse, Peromyscus slevini
†Giant island deer mouse, Peromyscus nesodytes
leucopus group
White-footed mouse, Peromyscus leucopus
Cotton mouse, Peromyscus gossypinus
aztecus group
Aztec mouse, Peromyscus aztecus
Gleaning mouse, Peromyscus spicilegus
Winkelmann's mouse, Peromyscus winkelmanni
boylii group
Brush mouse, Peromyscus boylii
Nimble-footed mouse, Peromyscus levipes
Orizaba deer mouse, Peromyscus beatae
Schmidly's deer mouse, Peromyscus schmidlyi
San Esteban Island mouse, Peromyscus stephani
Texas mouse, Peromyscus attwateri
Nayarit mouse, Peromyscus simulus
Tres Marias Island mouse, Peromyscus madrensis
White-ankled mouse, Peromyscus pectoralis
Chihuahuan mouse, Peromyscus polius
truei group
Pinyon mouse, Peromyscus truei
Osgood's mouse, Peromyscus gratus
Perote mouse, Peromyscus bullatus
Zacatecan deer mouse, Peromyscus difficilis
Northern rock mouse, Peromyscus nasutus
melanophrys group
Plateau mouse, Peromyscus melanophrys
Tawny deer mouse, Peromyscus perfulvus
Puebla deer mouse, Peromyscus mekisturus
furvus group
Blackish deer mouse, Peromyscus furvus
El Carrizo deer mouse, Peromyscus ochraventer
Maya mouse, Peromyscus mayensis
megalops group
Brown deer mouse, Peromyscus megalops
Black-tailed mouse, Peromyscus melanurus
Zempoaltepec, Peromyscus melanocarpus
mexicanus group
Mexican deer mouse, Peromyscus mexicanus
Naked-eared deer mouse, Peromyscus gymnotis
Guatemalan deer mouse, Peromyscus guatemalensis
Chiapan deer mouse, Peromyscus zarhynchus
Big deer mouse, Peromyscus grandis
Yucatan deer mouse, Peromyscus yucatanicus
Stirton's deer mouse, Peromyscus stirtoni
Transvolcanic deer mouse, Peromyscus hylocetes
Genus Reithrodontomys - New World harvest mice
Guerrero harvest mouse, Reithrodontomys bakeri
Short-nosed harvest mouse, Reithrodontomys brevirostris
Sonoran harvest mouse, Reithrodontomys burti
Volcano harvest mouse, Reithrodontomys chrysopsis
Chiriqui harvest mouse, Reithrodontomys creper
Darien harvest mouse, Reithrodontomys darienensis
Fulvous harvest mouse, Reithrodontomys fulvescens
Slender harvest mouse, Reithrodontomys gracilis
Hairy harvest mouse, Reithrodontomys hirsutus
Eastern harvest mouse, Reithrodontomys humulis
Western harvest mouse, Reithrodontomys megalotis
Mexican harvest mouse, Reithrodontomys mexicanus
Small-toothed harvest mouse, Reithrodontomys microdon
Plains harvest mouse, Reithrodontomys montanus
Reithrodontomys musseri
Nicaraguan harvest mouse, Reithrodontomys paradoxus
Salt marsh harvest mouse, Reithrodontomys raviventris
Rodriguez's harvest mouse, Reithrodontomys rodriguezi
Cozumel harvest mouse, Reithrodontomys spectabilis
Sumichrast's harvest mouse, Reithrodontomys sumichrasti
Narrow-nosed harvest mouse, Reithrodontomys tenuirostris
Zacatecas harvest mouse, Reithrodontomys zacatecae
Genus Onychomys - grasshopper mice
Chihuahuan grasshopper mouse, Onychomys arenicola
Northern grasshopper mouse, Onychomys leucogaster
Southern grasshopper mouse, Onychomys torridus
Genus Neotomodon
Mexican volcano mouse, Neotomodon alstoni
Genus Podomys
Florida mouse, Podomys floridanus
Genus Isthmomys - isthmus rats
Yellow isthmus rat, Isthmomys flavidus
Mount Pirri isthmus rat, Isthmomys pirrensis
Genus Megadontomys - giant deer mice
Oaxaca giant deer mouse, Megadontomys cryophilus
Nelson's giant deer mouse, Megadontomys nelsoni
Thomas's giant deer mouse, Megadontomys thomasi
Genus Habromys - deer mice
Chinanteco deer mouse, Habromys chinanteco
Delicate deer mouse, Habromys delicatulus
Ixtlán deer mouse, Habromys ixtlani
Zempoaltepec deer mouse, Habromys lepturus
Crested-tailed deer mouse, Habromys lophurus
Habromys schmidlyi
Jico deer mouse, Habromys simulatus
Genus Osgoodomys
Michoacan deer mouse, Osgoodomys banderanus
Incertae sedis
Protorepomys
Tsaphanomys

See also 
New World rats and mice

References

Reeder, S. A., D. S. Carroll, C. W. Edwards, C. W. Kilpatrick, R. D. Bradley.  2006. Neotomine-peromyscine rodent systematics based on combined analyses of nuclear and mitochondrial DNA sequences.  Molecular Phylogenetics and Evolution, 40:251-258.
Steppan, S. J., R. A. Adkins, and J. Anderson. 2004. Phylogeny and divergence date estimates of rapid radiations in muroid rodents based on multiple nuclear genes. Systematic Biology, 53:533-553.

 
Mammal subfamilies